Podvyaznovo is a rural locality (a village) in Pekshinskoye Rural Settlement, Petushinsky District, Vladimir Oblast, Russia. The population was 36 as of 2010.

Geography 
Podvyaznovo is located 33 km northeast of Petushki (the district's administrative centre) by road. Pakhomovo is the nearest rural locality.

References 

Rural localities in Petushinsky District